Alfonso María Isabel Francisco Eugenio Gabriel Pedro Sebastián Pelayo Fernando Francisco de Paula Pío Miguel Rafael Juan José Joaquín Ana Zacarias Elisabeth Simeón Tereso Pedro Pablo Tadeo Santiago Simón Lucas Juan Mateo Andrés Bartolomé Ambrosio Geronimo Agustín Bernardo Candido Gerardo Luis-Gonzaga Filomeno Camilo Cayetano Andrés-Avelino Bruno Joaquín-Picolimini Felipe Luis-Rey-de-Francia Ricardo Esteban-Protomártir Genaro Nicolás Estanislao-de-Koska Lorenzo Vicente Crisostomo Cristano Darío Ignacio Francisco-Javier Francisco-de-Borja Higona Clemente Esteban-de-Hungría Ladislado Enrique Ildefonso Hermenegildo Carlos-Borromeo Eduardo Francisco-Régis Vicente-Ferrer Pascual Miguel-de-los-Santos Adriano Venancio Valentín Benito José-Oriol Domingo Florencio Alfacio Benére Domingo-de-Silos Ramón Isidro Manuel Antonio Todos-los-Santos de Borbón y Borbón (Madrid, 15 November 1866 - Madrid, 28 April 1934), also known as Don Alfonso de Borbón y Borbón, was a Spanish nobleman, the great-great-grandson of Charles III of Spain, and is known for having had 88 forenames. This is recognised as a record by Guinness World Records.

Alfonso was a son of Infante Sebastian of Portugal and Spain, and his second wife, Infanta Maria Christina. In 1929 he morganatically married Julia Méndez y Morales, losing all claims to the Spanish throne; the marriage remained childless and ended in divorce.

Notes

References 

1866 births
1934 deaths
Spanish royalty